This is a list of the current 63 members of the Althing (Icelandic Parliament), from 2017 until 2021.

Election results

List of chosen MPs

For the parties having qualified with a national result above the 5% election threshold, the 9 leveling seats (L1-L9) were first distributed party-wise according to the calculation method in this particular order (where the party's total number of national votes was divided by the sum of "won seats plus 1" - with an extra leveling seat granted to the party with the highest fraction - while repeating this process until all 9 leveling seats had been determined). At the next step, these leveling seats were then by the same order distributed one by one to the relative strongest constituency of the seat winning party (while disregarding the constituencies that already ran out of vacant leveling seats). At the third step, the specific leveling seat is finally granted to the party's highest ranked runner-up candidate within the constituency, according to the same accumulated candidate vote score as being used when apportioning the constituency seats.

References

Lists of Members of the Althing